Caleb Aekins (born 21 November 1997) is a Wales international professional rugby league footballer who plays as a  for Featherstone Rovers in the Championship.

He previously played for the Canberra Raiders and Penrith Panthers in the NRL and for the Leigh Centurions in the Betfred Championship.

Background
Aekins was born in Hamilton, New Zealand.

He played both rugby union and rugby league as a junior for the Otaika Eagles and Hikurangi Stags in rugby league and captained Whangarei Boys High School, in 2015 he moved over to Australia. Aekins is of Māori and Welsh descent.

Playing career

Penrith Panthers 
Aekins made his NRL debut in round 18 of the 2018 NRL season at fullback for Penrith against the Cronulla-Sutherland Sharks.

Aekins made eight appearances for Penrith in the 2020 NRL season as the club won the Minor Premiership.  He did not play in the 2020 finals series or Penrith's 2020 NRL Grand Final loss to Melbourne.

Canberra Raiders 
He was then released by Penrith and signed a contract to join Canberra for the 2021 season.

In round 6 of the 2021 NRL season, he made his debut for Canberra in their 35–10 loss against Parramatta.
Aekins made seven appearances for Canberra in the 2021 NRL season as the club finished 10th and missed the finals.

Leigh Centurions
Following the end of the season, Aekins was released by the Canberra side and on 10 November 2021 signed for British RFL Championship side Leigh for the 2022 season.
On 28 May 2022, Aekins played for Leigh in their 2022 RFL 1895 Cup final victory over Featherstone.
On 3 October 2022, Aekins played for Leigh in their Million Pound Game victory over Batley which saw the club promoted back to the Super League.

International career
Aekins was named in the Wales squad for the 2021 Rugby League World Cup. On 19 October 2022, he made his international debut for Wales in their 12–18 loss against the Cook Islands in the opening round of the group stages.

References

External links
Penrith Panthers profile
Wales profile
Welsh profile

1997 births
Living people
Canberra Raiders players
Featherstone Rovers players
Leigh Leopards players
New Zealand Māori rugby league players
New Zealand people of Welsh descent
New Zealand rugby league players
Penrith Panthers players
People educated at Whangarei Boys' High School
Rugby league fullbacks
Rugby league players from Otaika
Wales national rugby league team players